Butynamine is a tertiary (a highly hindered) aliphatic amine which has antihypertensive effects.

References 

Alkyne derivatives
Antihypertensive agents
Amines